Beyond Reality is a science fiction television series which originally aired between October 4, 1991 and March 20, 1993. The series is about two university parapsychologists (Shari Belafonte and Carl Marotte) who investigate reports of paranormal phenomena that occur in ordinary people's lives.

Episodes

Home media
Mill Creek Entertainment released the complete first season on DVD in Region 1 on January 23, 2007.

References

External links 

 

1990s Canadian science fiction television series
1991 Canadian television series debuts
1993 Canadian television series endings
USA Network original programming
Television shows filmed in Toronto